The priestly tunic ( kutonet) was as an undergarment or shirt worn by the High Priest and priests when they served in the Tabernacle and the Temple in Jerusalem.

Etymology
The Hebrew noun ketonet is the generic term for a tunic in Hebrew. The first use is the "coats" of skins made for Adam and Eve in Eden, the best known use would be the coat of many colours of Joseph. It is related to, and may be the source of, the Greek noun kiton "tunic."

Instructions for making the tunic
It was made of pure linen, covering the entire body from the neck to the feet, with sleeves reaching to the wrists. That of the High Priest was embroidered; those of the priests were plain.

On the Day of Atonement, the High priest would change into a special tunic made of fine linen that was not embroidered when he would enter the Holy of Holies. This tunic could only be used once, with a new set made for each year.

According to the Talmud, the wearing of the tunic and the rest of the priestly garments atoned for the sin of bloodshed on the part of the Children of Israel (B.Zevachim 88b).

References

See also
Priestly undergarments
Priestly sash
Priestly turban
Priestly robe (Judaism)
Ephod
Priestly breastplate
Priestly frontlet
Kittel, garment

Jewish religious clothing
Tunic